The Church of St. Peter and Paul is a Christian Catholic church in Bern, Switzerland. It is designated as a Cultural Property of National Significance

History
During the Protestant Reformation in the early 16th century, the city of Bern adopted the new Protestant faith and the city's churches converted, leaving the remaining Catholics in Bern without a church. Over the following centuries, they remained without a church in the city. Following the French invasion of Switzerland in 1798 and the political reforms of the Helvetic Republic, the catholic community of Bern held mass in the choir of the Bern Minster until 1803. Beginning in 1804 they moved to the French Church on Zeughausgasse.

The Church of St. Peter and Paul was begun in 1858 as the first Catholic church built in Bern since the Reformation. It was built next to the Town Hall of Bern, on the site of the St. Johannsen granary (which had been built over the ruins of a mint which burnt to the ground in 1787). The church was designed by H Marchal and Pierre-Joseph Edmond Deperthes in the style of the Romanesque and French cathedral Gothic. Construction began in 1858 under the supervision of Emmanuel Müller and was completed in 1864. The first mass was celebrated in the church on 13 November 1864. Following the First Vatican Council (1869-1870) some Catholics in Switzerland were dissatisfied with the Council and split away from the church to form the Christian Catholic Church of Switzerland. In 1875, the Church of St. Peter and Paul became the parish church of the Old Catholic congregation in Bern.

In 1965-67 the bell tower and south facade were renovated, followed by several additional renovations.

References

External links

Cathedrals in Switzerland
Old City (Bern)
Cultural property of national significance in the canton of Bern
Gothic Revival church buildings in Switzerland
Churches in the canton of Bern
Old Catholic church buildings
Old Catholicism in Switzerland
Former Roman Catholic church buildings
19th-century churches in Switzerland